William Glover Farrow (September 24, 1918 – October 15, 1942) was a lieutenant in the United States Army Air Forces who participated in the Doolittle Raid. In February 1942, he volunteered to participate in the raid, which took place on April 18 that year. Farrow was captured by the Japanese after the completion of his bombing mission.  Along with two other crew members, he was tried and sentenced to death and executed by firing squad for firing machine guns at civilian targets. His ashes were recovered and interred in the Arlington National Cemetery in 1946, and he posthumously received multiple awards.

Early life
William Farrow was born in Darlington, South Carolina, on September 24, 1918. His father Isaac was employed at a cigarette company in Raleigh, North Carolina; his mother Jessie, born in 1897, was the daughter of a wealthy tobacco warehouse owner. At age sixteen, William became an Eagle Scout. He graduated from St. John's High School in May 1935, and went on to attend the University of South Carolina.

Military career
During the fall of 1939, he received his pilot training at the Hawthorne School of Aeronautics in Orangeburg, South Carolina. On November 23, 1940, Farrow joined the United States Army Air Corps' Aviation Cadet Program. He joined the Air Corps training program in November 1940, and was commissioned in July 1941.

In July of the following year, he obtained his aviator badge and a commission as a second lieutenant at Kelly Field in Texas. Following his completion of the B-25 Mitchell training program, he was sent to Pendleton Field in Oregon as a member of the 34th Bomb Squadron.

Doolittle Raid

In February 1942, following the squadron's transfer to Columbia Army Air Base in January, Farrow volunteered to participate in the Doolittle Raid, an attempt to retaliate against the Japanese as a result of their attack on Pearl Harbor. At the time, however, the mission was secret and its target unknown to the volunteers. On April 1, 1942, after training in various places around the United States, the crews and their respective aircraft departed from San Francisco aboard the USS Hornet (CV-8). The mission took place on April 18. The B-25 which Farrow piloted, named Bat out of Hell, was the sixteenth and final aircraft to depart from the Hornet. Number 16, under his command, had targeted Osaka in the plan but invaded Nagoya and bombed the city. After the aircraft's targets in Nagoya, which included an oil tank and aircraft factory, had been bombed, Farrow intended to land in Chuchow. However, the Japanese had deactivated the beacon that Farrow was using for direction.

Capture and death
The Imperial Japanese Forces was desperately searching for the whereabouts of Number 16. Sixteen hours after departure from the Hornet, the aircraft's fuel exhausted, Farrow and his crew bailed out near Japanese-controlled Nanchang, China. The Japanese captured Farrow and all members of his crew, and subjected them to imprisonment, interrogation, and torture. The men were subsequently tried and sentenced to death. Most of the crew members' sentences were commuted to life imprisonment by the Emperor of Japan, but the sentences of three men, including Farrow, stood. The night before their execution, the men were permitted to write final letters. The International Red Cross was to mail the letters after receiving them from the Japanese. The Japanese, however, did not pass on the letters, and they were never mailed. Farrow wrote letters to his mother and to a friend, Lt. Ivan Ferguson. In the letter addressed to his mother, Farrow wrote:

At dawn on October 15, the men were taken to a public cemetery near Shanghai, where they were shot by a Japanese firing squad. Following the bodies' cremation, the ashes were taken to a mortuary. After the war ended, the men's ashes were recovered and their letters found in a secret file of the War Ministry Building in Tokyo. In 1946, Farrow was interred with honors at the Arlington National Cemetery, Section 12, Grave 157.

Honors

Farrow was posthumously given multiple awards. These included the Order of the Sacred Tripod (寶鼎勳章) of the Republic of China, the Distinguished Flying Cross, and the Purple Heart. He was also awarded the Prisoner of War Medal, which, by authorization of Congress in 1985, was given to all members of the United States Armed Forces who had been a prisoner of war after April 5, 1917.

He is the namesake of the Arnold Air Society’s William Glover Farrow Squadron hosted by AFROTC Detachment 775 at USC.

References

External links
 ANC Explorer

1918 births
1942 deaths
People from Darlington, South Carolina
Military personnel from South Carolina
Doolittle Raiders
University of South Carolina alumni
Recipients of the Distinguished Flying Cross (United States)
United States Army Air Forces bomber pilots of World War II
United States Army Air Forces officers
United States Army Air Forces personnel killed in World War II
People executed by Japanese occupation forces
People executed by Japan by firing squad
Deaths by firearm in China
Aviators from South Carolina
Burials at Arlington National Cemetery
World War II prisoners of war held by Japan
Recipients of the Order of the Sacred Tripod
American prisoners of war in World War II